Dr. Azel Parkhurst Ladd (1811– July 27, 1854) was an American educator, physician and politician from Wisconsin.

Born in Haverhill, New Hampshire, Ladd studied medicine at Harvard University and taught school in Massachusetts. In 1842, he moved to Shullsburg, Wisconsin where he was involved with mining. In 1851, Ladd called for "temporary normal schools" to provide for more teachers. He was elected as the second Superintendent of Public Instruction of Wisconsin, serving from 1852 to 1854 with a salary of $1,000 dollars per year. Through regional meetings he organized the Wisconsin Teachers' Association and called the first state teachers' convention in 1853. He was also involved with the Wisconsin Historical Society. Ladd was an advocate for the Common School Fund.

Following his term in office, Ladd briefly resumed his medical practice. Ladd died from cholera at the age of 42 in 1854, six months after leaving office.

Notes

1811 births
1854 deaths
People from Haverhill, New Hampshire
Educators from Wisconsin
Superintendents of Public Instruction of Wisconsin
People from Shullsburg, Wisconsin
19th-century American politicians
19th-century American educators